Andrei Stepanovich Konovalov (born 13 September 1974) is a Russian professional football coach and a former player.

Club career
He made his debut in the Russian Premier League in 1993 for FC Spartak Moscow.

References

1974 births
Association football midfielders
FC Arsenal Tula players
PFC Krylia Sovetov Samara players
FC Rubin Kazan players
FC Shinnik Yaroslavl players
FC SKA-Khabarovsk players
FC Sokol Saratov players
FC Spartak Moscow players
FC Tekstilshchik Kamyshin players
FC Torpedo Moscow players
Living people
Russian footballers
Russia under-21 international footballers
Russian Premier League players
Soviet footballers